Yekaterina Aleksandrovna Marennikova (born 29 April 1982) is a Russian handball player, world champion and olympic medallist playing for HC Kuban Krasnodar and the Russian national team. She won gold medals at the 2005 World Championships and 2016 Rio Olympics, placing second in 2008 and eighth in 2012.

Marennikova is married to Eduard and has a son Andrei. She has a degree in physical education from the Lesgaft Institute in Saint Petersburg.

References

1982 births
Living people
Sportspeople from Saint Petersburg
Russian female handball players
Olympic handball players of Russia
Olympic medalists in handball
Olympic silver medalists for Russia
Olympic gold medalists for Russia
Handball players at the 2008 Summer Olympics
Handball players at the 2012 Summer Olympics
Handball players at the 2016 Summer Olympics
Medalists at the 2008 Summer Olympics
Medalists at the 2016 Summer Olympics